Agapanthiola leucaspis is a species of beetle in the family Cerambycidae. It was described by Steven in 1817.

References

Agapanthiini
Beetles described in 1817